Grange Lane railway station was a railway station located on the South Yorkshire Railway line between Sheffield and Barnsley in South Yorkshire, England. At the time of its building it was located alongside the lane from which it takes its name with few houses nearby. From the early 1890s it became the interchange point with coal traffic from Grange Colliery at Kimberworth in Rotherham, South Yorkshire. 
The colliery was sunk in 1891 and coal production ceased in 1963. The colliery site is now Grange Park golf course.

The station, opened in June 1855, consisted of two flanking platforms with buildings on each. The line and the crossing gates were controlled from a signal box situated at the end of the platform adjacent to the gates.

The station was closed on 7 December 1953 and most buildings existed until late 2011; the station building is a private residence.

References 

 

Ecclesfield
Disused railway stations in Sheffield
Railway stations in Great Britain opened in 1855
Railway stations in Great Britain closed in 1953
Former South Yorkshire Railway stations